UNITY: Journalists for Diversity was an alliance of the Asian American Journalists Association, the National Lesbian and Gay Journalists Association, the Native American Journalists Association. UNITY served as the umbrella organization under which the groups hold a joint convention. UNITY conventions were held in 1994 (Atlanta), 1999 (Seattle), 2004 (Washington, D.C.), 2008 (Chicago) and 2012 (Las Vegas).

The first president of Unity was San Francisco Bay Area television journalist Lloyd LaCuesta. David Steinberg of the San Francisco Chronicle, a former president of the National Lesbian and Gay Journalists Association, is president.

The four founding UNITY organizations were the National Association of Black Journalists, the National Association of Hispanic Journalists, the Asian American Journalists Association and the Native American Journalists Association.

NABJ left UNITY in 2011 and NLGJA joined later that year. NAHJ withdrew from the alliance in October 2013.

The organization officially ceased operation in February 2018.

References 

American journalism organizations
Asian-American organizations
Hispanic and Latino American organizations
Native American organizations
Supraorganizations